The Panwar is a Jat and Rajput clan found in Northern India, especially in Haryana, Rajasthan and Uttarakhand.

See also 
 Panwar dynasty
 Paramara dynasty

References 

Rajput clans
Rajput clans of Uttarakhand
Garhwali Rajputs
Panwar dynasty
Indian surnames